Dreyfus Records  is a record label which released the work of artists such as Jean-Michel Jarre who was part of the label for more than 20 years.

Francis Dreyfus founded Disques Dreyfus in 1985. The label was a part of the Dreyfus family company owned by Dreyfus Records, French music distributor. On January 4, 2013 the company ceased its operations and its catalog was absorbed by BMG Rights Management Group.

Dreyfus Jazz was founded in 1991 in Paris as a division of the Francis Dreyfus Music company to reissue albums by Charlie Haden, Eddy Louiss, Red Mitchell, Michel Portal, Bud Powell, John Lewis, and Martial Solal. In 1992 Dreyfus produced new recordings by Philip Catherine, Richard Galliano,  Steve Grossman, Roy Haynes, Didier Lockwood, the Mingus Big Band, and Michel Petrucciani. There were also albums of unreleased music by Bill Evans, Stan Getz, and Art Pepper.

Partial roster

Adan Jodorowsky
Franck Avitabile
Philip Catherine
Christophe
Anne Ducros
Hadrien Feraud
Richard Galliano
Steve Grossman
Roy Haynes
Ari Hoenig
Ahmad Jamal
Jean-Michel Jarre
Bert Joris
Olivier Ker Ourio
Biréli Lagrène
Sara Lazarus
Didier Lockwood
Eddy Louiss
Sylvain Luc
Marcus Miller
Mingus Big Band
Térez Montcalm
Lucky Peterson
Michel Petrucciani
Jean-Michel Pilc
Aldo Romano
Luis Salinas
Dorado Schmitt
Alan Stivell
Trio Esperança
Klement Julienne
Rocky Gresset

See also
 List of record labels

References

French record labels
Jazz record labels
Electronic music record labels